Jean Louis Auguste Brachet (19 March 1909 – 10 August 1988) was a Belgian biochemist who made a key contribution in understanding the role of RNA.

Life

Brachet was born in Etterbeek near Brussels in Belgium, the son of Albert Brachet, embryologist.

He was educated at L'Ecole Alsacienne in Paris then studied medicine at the Université Libre de Bruxelles graduating in 1934. He then worked at the University of Cambridge and at Princeton University and at several institutes of marine biological research. Brachet was appointed Professor of Animal Morphology and General Biology at the Université Libre de Bruxelles and Research Director of the International Laboratory for Genetics and Biophysics in Naples.

In 1933 Brachet was able to show that DNA was found in chromosomes and that RNA was present in the cytoplasm of all cells. His work with Torbjörn Caspersson showed that RNA plays an active role in protein synthesis. Brachet also carried out pioneering work in the field of cell differentiation. Brachet demonstrated that differentiation is preceded by the formation of new ribosomes and accompanied by the release from the nucleus of a wave of new messenger RNA.

In 1934 he married Francoise de Baray.

In 1948 Jean Brachet was awarded the Francqui Prize for Biological and Medical Sciences.

Publications
Embryologie Chimique (1944)
Biological Cytology (1957)
Introduction to Molecular Embryology (1957)
Molecular Cytology (2 vols.) (1985)

References

External links
Photo

1909 births
1988 deaths
Belgian biochemists
Foreign Members of the Royal Society
Foreign associates of the National Academy of Sciences
Free University of Brussels (1834–1969) alumni
Academic staff of the Free University of Brussels (1834–1969)
Princeton University fellows
Schleiden Medal recipients